Lac à Jack (English: Jack's Lake) is a freshwater body located in the unorganized territory of Lac-Pikauba, in the Charlevoix Regional County Municipality, in the administrative region of Capitale-Nationale, in the province of Quebec, in Canada. This body of water is located in the Laurentides Wildlife Reserve.

Lake à Jack is one of the head water bodies of the Malbaie River. This mountain lake is entirely located in an area where forestry has always been the predominant economic activity. In the middle of XIXth, recreational tourism activities took off. Due to the altitude, this lake is normally frozen from the end of October to the end of April; however, the safe ice circulation period is usually from early December to April.

Secondary forest roads serve the southern part of the hydrographic slope of Lac à Jack. The northeast part does not have a passable road.

Geography 
Located in a forest area in the unorganized territory of Lac-Pikauba in the Laurentides Wildlife Reserve, Lac à Jack is located on the western slope of the Malbaie River valley. It covers an area of 2.3 km² in a partially marshy basin. Jack's lake has been modified by facilities designed to facilitate the log drive that is practiced each spring, notably the construction of the dam. The dam at the mouth of Lac à Jack is located on the east side of the lake. This mouth is located at:
  east of the mouth of Fronsac Lake;
  north-west of the mouth of the Lac à Jack outlet (confluence with the Malbaie River);
  north-west of the mouth of Malbaie Lake;
  west of downtown Baie-Saint-Paul;
  south-west of La Malbaie town center.

Main attractions 
One of the largest in the Laurentian wildlife reserve, Lac à Jack is popular for speckled trout fishing (30,000 catches per year). In addition, a canoe-camping circuit on the Malbaie River begins at the foot of the dam to cross the entire park; the descent allows you to admire the wild landscape of the park.

Toponymy 
This toponymic designation appears on regional map number 3, 1943.

The name "Grand lac à Jack" appeared on maps at the beginning of the 20th century. The origin of the toponym remains uncertain. However, the presence of an Amerindian named Jacques Bacon, who spent the summer camping in these areas with his family, several decades ago, could be linked to the origin of this body of water. The construction of the Lac-à-Jack dam allowed the passage of a road that links the Jacques-Cartier lake sector to the Grands-Jardins conservation park. This name was approved on April 3, 1959, by the Commission de géographie du Québec. Grand lac Jack and Grand lac à Jack are variants of the official name.

The toponym "Lac à Jack" was formalized on December 5, 1968, at the Place Names Bank of the Commission de toponymie du Québec.

Related articles 

 Charlevoix Regional County Municipality
 Lac-Pikauba, an unorganized territory
 Laurentides Wildlife Reserve
 Fronsac Lake
 Malbaie River

References 

Lakes of Capitale-Nationale
Charlevoix Regional County Municipality
Laurentides Wildlife Reserve